Parliamentary elections were held in Mali on 26 June 1988. The country was a one-party state at the time, with the Democratic Union of the Malian People (UDPM) as the sole legal party. As a result, the UDPM won all 82 seats in the National Assembly. Voter turnout was reported to be 97.8%.

Results

References

1988 in Mali
Mali
Elections in Mali
One-party elections
Election and referendum articles with incomplete results